The Stiftung Nachwuchs Campus Basel, in English foundation Youth Campus Basel, was brought to life by Gigi Oeri in 2010, with the aim to continuously develop FC Basel’s youth division on a long-term basis. The foundation is registered with the Swiss company register. The foundation built and now runs the campus grounds, they rebuilt and run the Wohnhuus and they aid in the administration of the youth department. The foundation aids in the integral training and promotion of young football talents.

FC Basel’s youth department traditionally enjoys a high status. Since FC Basel moved into the newly built St. Jakob-Park in 2001, over 40 youth players have advanced to their first team. Many of these players later moved onto top European clubs, as example the following players; Marco Streller, Philipp und David Degen, Ivan Rakitic, Xherdan Shaqiri, Granit Xhaka Breel Embolo and Yann Sommer. Several members of FCB’s current first team players have also passed through Basel’s youth teams, these are for example; Fabian Frei, Valentin Stocker, Eray Cömert, Raoul Petretta, Samuele Campo, Taulant Xhaka, Afimico Pululu, Jozef Pukaj, Tician Tushi, Felix Gebhardt, Orges Bunjaku and Albian Hajdari.

FC Basel's youth department consists of the following sections: 
Formation, with the teams: U-21, U-18, U-17, U-16 and U-15
Préformation/Children’s Football, with the teams: (FE14, FE13, FE12, E11 and E10)

The foundation board
The members of the board are; Gigi Oeri, Dr. Bruno Dallo, Jacques Herzog and Benno Kaiser. The first managing director of the foundation was Benno Kaiser who has since stepped down from this position. A new position was created at that time, delegate of the foundation board. Pascal Naef holds this position since October 2017 and he therefore acts as managing director.

Business management
In addition to Naef, the other members of the business management are Stefano Ceccaroni, who is responsible for the pedagogy, residential building and nutrition since January 2017, and Danique Stein who, also since October 2017, is head of finances and is responsible for administration and events.

The foundation’s aim
The foundation Youth Campus Basel was founded in 2010 by the then FCB chairwoman Gigi Oeri with the aim of promoting youth football in Basel on a sustainable basis. The foundation is not bound by party politics or ideology. It has a charitable character and is not profit-oriented. The purpose of the foundation is the integral training and promotion of young football talents in football, schooling, education and personality. To support the FCB youngsters, the foundation enables comprehensive and sustainable training for all players with a dual training system. This means that the young footballers can attain the best possible school or apprenticeship qualification in parallel to their athletic training.

Campus
The campus was officially opened in August 2013 after three years of planning and building. The Base area is 1,310 m² and is located on the Campusweg 15 in Münchenstein. The outside area consists of four grass pitches and an artificial turf field. One natural grass field is also heated, so that the youth campus can be operated all year round. The main field is 105x68 meters and also has a small grandstand with covered seats, maximum 1,000 spectators. The synthetic turf field is also 105x68 meters, the other pitches are 100x64. All youth teams play on these grounds The Campus also consists of a building with changing room facilities, fitness room, restaurant, meeting room and offices for staff and coaches.

Wohnhuus
The Wohnhuus or accommodation centre provides space for 18 players and offers them supervised accommodation and nutrition. The Wohnhuus is located on the Lehenmattstrasse in Basel, close to the sport complex St. Jakob, with swimming basins, athletics track, playing fields, campus and stadium. The house number 336 offers assisted living and is for those players who have reached the age of 18. Nine furnished apartments are available. House 338 offers supervised living for up to 14 youngsters between the ages of 14 and 18.

References

External links
 
 FCB Nachwuchs

FC Basel